Shootfighting is a martial art and combat sport, with competitions governed by the International Shootfighting Association (ISFA). It incorporates techniques from a multitude of traditional martial arts, the most principal of these being wrestling and kenpo.

Shootfighting was previously used synonymously with mixed martial arts competitions in Japan, as opposed to shoot-style professional wrestling competitions. The term has been retired from common usage because it became a registered trademark of Bart Vale, who uses it to describe his hybrid fighting system derived from shoot wrestling. However, it is still sometimes used colloquially.

Examples which were once considered shootfighting styles, tournaments or organizations are Pancrase, Shoot boxing and Shooto, where many fighters still considered themselves to be shootfighters. Ken Shamrock is possibly the most recognisable shoot fighter, as it was the discipline he used during the early days of the UFC.

History

Shootfighting's use as a synonym for mixed martial arts had its genesis in the 1970s, when Karl Gotch taught a group of Japanese professional wrestlers catch wrestling techniques, called "hooking" or "shooting". In 1976, one of these pro-wrestlers, Antonio Inoki, hosted a series of matches against practitioners of other martial arts, most of these were "worked" (predetermined) but one particular high-profile one was against Muhammad Ali, which was in fact a shoot. This led to an increased interest in real and effective technique, and eventually led to the creation of shoot wrestling, with some shoot-style professional wrestling organizations hosting legitimate mixed martial arts bouts, called "shoots". In the 1990s the interest grew, and certain shoot-style organizations like Shooto, Pancrase and RINGS evolved into pure "shoot" organizations. The term "shootfighting" was frequently used to describe these events and styles.

Bart Vale, an American with a background in professional wrestling, champion of the Japanese Pro Wrestling Fujiwara Gumi (PWFG, a Japanese shoot-style professional wrestling organization) for close to three years moved back to America and used the term "shootfighting", to describe his own hybrid fighting system, which was a combination of the shoot wrestling techniques he had learned in Japan, and his experience in kenpo, jujutsu and Muay Thai. He also founded the International Shootfighting Association to promote shootfighting as a combat sport. He also would trademark the term, reserving the rights to use it for himself and his organization.

Ken Shamrock, at the time Pancrase champion and former Fujiwara Gumi alumni, entered in UFC 1 representing "Shootfighting", describing his fighting style at Pancrase. With Shamrock's success in the early UFC, Bart Vale would use a worked victory at Fujiwara Gumi against Shamrock claiming it was a real fight to promote himself in the United States as a MMA legend in Japan. His actual MMA record is 1-2-0.

Rules

Shootfighting is a hybrid martial art, with similar but more limited rules compared to Mixed martial arts.

Currently professional shootfighting matches consists only of a heavyweight (200 lb or more) division. But there are lighter divisions for amateur competitors. Pro matches run 30 minutes non-stop, amateurs 10 minutes. Held inside a standard wrestling ring, competitors are allowed to kick, knee or elbow any part of the body except the groin, as well as headbutt. Punches are allowed to the body. Since no gloves are worn to facilitate wrestling, punches aren't allowed to the head, although open hand palms and slaps are allowed. Any type of throw or takedown is legal and competitors are allowed to hit a downed opponent. Additionally, any type of joint lock is legal as are chokes against the side of the neck. The only foul consists of punches to the face, eye-gouges, techniques against the windpipe and groin strikes.

Fights are won when a competitor is knocked down for a 10 count, knocked down 5 times or forced to submit. A fighter caught in a submission hold may grab the ropes to break the hold, but this counts as a 1/3 of a knock down. Grabbing the ropes 15 times equals a loss. Bouts that go to the full time limit are declared a draw.

See also
 Aliveness (martial arts)
 Pancrase
 Pride Fighting Championships
 Fighting Network RINGS
 Puroresu
 Shooto
 Ultimate Fighting Championship
 Vale tudo

References

 Chan, Sam. The Japanese Pro-Wrestling: Reality Based Martial Art Connection. bjj.org. URL last accessed January 7, 2006.
 Herzog, Paul. History of Shootfighting. www.mindspring.com. URL last accessed January 7, 2006.
 International Shootfighting Association. History of the ISFA. www.shootfighting.com. URL last accessed January 7, 2006.

External links
 International Shootfighting Association The homepage of the International Shootfighting Association.
 Official Shootfighting information & training in Vallejo, Fairfield, Vacaville & Davis, CA
 American Kenpo & Shootfighting
 Swedish Shootfighting Association

Combat sports
Hybrid martial arts
Japanese martial arts
Sports originating in Japan
Sports originating in the United States
North American martial arts
Martial arts in the United States